Wisin & Yandel is a Puerto Rican reggaeton duo consisting of Wisin and Yandel. They started their career in the late 1990s and have been together since, winning several awards including a Grammy Award in 2009. They became the first and the only reggaeton artists to win one. In late 2013, they announced they would take a pause in their career as a duo, after their Líderes Tour. In a 2014 interview with People en Español, Yandel confirmed that the group would not be disbanding. In February 2018, following a five-year hiatus, the duo announced they would be reuniting, and are set to embark on a world tour, as well as release new music. They sold over 15 million records.

History

Beginning (1998–2004) 
In 1998, Wisin & Yandel participated in the album No Fear 3, produced by DJ Dicky as well as on the compilation album La Misión Vol. 1, edited by the Fresh Productions label. The success of this collection (which was certified gold) led the label to produce Los Reyes del Nuevo Milenio, the first album by Wisin & Yandel.

From that moment the duo started a successful career. They continued posting new topics in the successive editions of La Misión and recorded three new albums: De Nuevos a Viejos (2001), Mi Vida... My Life (2003) and De Otra Manera (2004), all of which were certified gold. The duo also received the Tu Música Award for Best Rap/Reggaeton Duo in 2002.

In 2004, the duo released two separate solo efforts: El Sobreviviente by Wisin and Quien Contra Mí by Yandel, which sparked speculation about a possible separation. Sales of the albums were unimpressive, and the duo remained together.

Pa'l Mundo and WY Records (2005–2006) 
The duo started their own label under the name of WY Records. In 2005, they released their first album under it, titled Pa'l Mundo, which became their most successful to date. The record reached international status when it reached countries like China, Japan and some European countries. The album also peaked at #1 on Billboards Top Latin Albums and was certified gold by RIAA. After the success of Pa'l Mundo, Wisin & Yandel released Los Vaqueros in 2006, which featured appearances of WY Records artists like Franco "El Gorila", Tony Dize, and Yomille Omar, as well as guest artists like Don Omar and Héctor el Father.

International consolidation (2007–2012) 

On November 7, 2007, Wisin & Yandel released the album Los Extraterrestres, which featured collaborations with international artists like Eve and Fat Joe. The album was received positively by the Puerto Rican media, with mainstream newspaper Primera Hora awarding it a score of 4 out of 5. The review praised the fusion of styles found in the album, claiming that the production continued the "musical evolution" found in its predecessors.

Following the release of Los Extraterrestres the duo commenced an international promotional tour. After organizing concerts throughout Latin America and Europe, Wisin & Yandel noted that they would like to expand their markets to Africa and Australia. Wisin & Yandel participated in the closing ceremonies of the 2008 Viña del Mar Festival. The tickets for the event sold out, which the duo described as a "real honor". On June 2, 2008, the duo began a tour to promote Wisin vs. Yandel: Los Extraterrestres, Otra Dimensión, visiting several radio stations in Puerto Rico.

In June 2008, Wisin & Yandel participated in the 2008 edition of New York City's Puerto Rican Day Parade, organized on June 8, 2008. On June 12, 2008, they traveled to Los Angeles to attend the BMI Latin Awards, in which they received a nomination for Writer of the Year. Later they also received four Juventud Awards. They also made a guest appearance in an album titled Caribbean Connection released on June 24, 2008. The production featured several Latin American artists including Daddy Yankee, Don Omar and Héctor el Father along Jamaican musicians like Inner Circle, Bounty Killer, Elephant Man and Wayne Wonder. 

On July 19, 2008, the duo made a presentation before a sold-out crowd in Venezuela. The duet were selected to perform in "KQ Live Concert" on September 27, 2008, organized by KQ 105 FM, which included several Puerto Rican and Latin American artists. On August 12, 2008, the mayor of their hometown of Cayey, Rolando Ortíz Velázquez, recognized Wisin & Yandel as "Ambassadors from Cayey to the world" during the city's annual Fiesta patronal. On April 24, 2009, Wisin & Yandel received the Latin Rhythm Album of the Year, Duo or Group Latin Billboard Music Award for Los Extraterresres. Besides this recognition, the duo also received nominations for "Ahora Es" and "Síguelo" in the Tropical Airplay Song of the Year, Duo or Group and Latin Rhythm Airplay Song of the Year, Duo or Group categories.

In May 2009, Wisin & Yandel released their next album La Revolución, which featured rapper 50 Cent. Like their previous album, it peaked at #1 on Billboards Top Latin Albums. On October 15, 2009, Wisin & Yandel won the Latin American MTV Award for "Artist of the Year" and "Video of the Year". In 2011, the duo released Los Vaqueros: El Regreso which peaked at #1 on several charts.

In April 2012, the duo announced that they will be the opening act for Spanish singer Enrique Iglesias and American artist Jennifer Lopez at the Enrique Iglesias and Jennifer Lopez in Concert but later decided to opt out on June 29, 2012.  Their album Líderes has a release date of July 3, 2012.
Wisin & Yandel have both decided to release solo albums in 2013.  Wisin's "El Regreso del Sobreviviente" was released on March 18, 2014. Yandel's "De Lider a Leyenda" was released on November 5, 2013.

Wisin & Yandel were coaches in the third season of La Voz... México.

Hiatus and solo careers (late 2013–2017) 

In November 2013, after the Líderes Tour, the dúo went into hiatus, causing rumors to arise about their split, saying it was because of differences between them. Yandel denied such claims, assuring fans that they have not disbanded. In early April 2014, Wisin said on Radio Fórmula: "I think that late 2015 or 2016 we're ready with a new album as Wisin & Yandel – This is just a facet; it's a pause to refresh ourselves to make something different." Later in August 2014, Yandel said: "Wisin & Yandel is a registered trademark, we always work together – We are now providing separate projects, we'll soon be seen together again."

Wisin completed his second solo album, El Regreso del Sobreviviente in 2013, releasing it in 2014. Meanwhile, Yandel made his first solo tour and promoted his second solo album De Líder a Leyenda around the same time period. In September 2014, they both confirmed they were working on a new track that would premiere and be performed for the first time on Yandel's De Líder a Leyenda tour on October 4, at the José Miguel Agrelot Coliseum in San Juan, Puerto Rico.

Beginning in 2017, the two have made collaborations for each other in a couple of songs. On September 8, 2017,  Yandel released the single "Como Antes" from his new album featuring Wisin, which came after their long-awaited return as a duo. On November 24, 2017, Wisin featured Yandel and Daddy Yankee in "Todo Comienza en la Disco".

Reunion and new album (2018–present) 
In February 2018, the duo announced their reunion from their hiatus. One month later, they announced their first US concert at Madison Square Garden. The concert, held on June 8, was to celebrate their Puerto Rican heritage. The concert took place during the Puerto Rican Day Parade weekend in New York City. In May 2018, Wisin & Yandel announced on their Instagram a concert for November 30, 2018, at the José Miguel Agrelot Coliseum in Puerto Rico. The show sold out quickly and resulted in the addition of more shows – the duo ended up having 8 back to back shows at this venue.

In October 25, 2018, they released "Reggaetón en lo Oscuro" as the lead single from their upcoming tenth studio album. On December 14, they released their latest album Los Campeones del Pueblo which features collaborations with many artists including Ozuna, Maluma, and Bad Bunny. At the same time, they released two compilation albums Como en los Tiempos de Antes and Juntos Otra Vez.

In March 2022, the duo announced La Última Misión World Tour, which is to be their final tour as a duo and will coincide with a new album.

Members 
 Juan Luis Morera Luna (Wisin), born , is from Cayey, Puerto Rico. 
 Llandel Veguilla Malavé (Yandel), born , also from Cayey.

Discography

Studio albums 
 2000: Los Reyes del Nuevo Milenio
 2001: De Nuevos a Viejos
 2002: De Otra Manera
 2005: Pa'l Mundo
 2007: Los Extraterrestres
 2009: La Revolución
 2011: Los Vaqueros: El Regreso
 2012: Líderes
 2018: Los Campeones del Pueblo
 2022: La Última Misión

Live albums 
 2007: Tomando Control: Live
 2010: La Revolución: Live

Compilation albums 
 2003: Mi Vida... My Life
 2006: Los Vaqueros
 2008: La Mente Maestra
 2009: El Dúo de la Historia Vol. 1
 2010: Lo Mejor De La Compañía
 2018: Como En Los Tiempos de Antes (DJ mix)
 2018: Juntos Otra Vez

Solo albums

Wisin 
 2004: El Sobreviviente
 2014: El Regreso del Sobreviviente
 2015: Los Vaqueros: La Trilogía
 2017: Victory
 2021: Los Legendarios 001
 2022: Multimillo, Vol. 1

Yandel 

 2003: Quien Contra Mí
 2013: De Líder a Leyenda
 2015: Dangerous
 2017: Update
 2019: The One 
 2020: Quien Contra Mí 2
 2023: Resistencia

Concert tours 
 Pa'l Mundo Tour (2006-07)
 Los Vaqueros Tour (2007)
 Los Extraterrestres World Tour (2008-09) 
 La Revolución World Tour (2009-10)
 Los Vaqueros: El Regreso World Tour (2011)
 Lideres World Tour (2012)
 Como Antes Tour (2018–2019)
 La Última Misión World Tour (2022)

Awards and nominations

References

External links 

 

Puerto Rican reggaeton musicians
Puerto Rican musical duos
Reggaeton duos
Musical groups established in 1998
Machete Music artists
Universal Music Latino artists
Sony Music Latin artists
Grammy Award winners
Latin Grammy Award winners